Logan Paul Chalmers (born 24 March 2000) is a Scottish professional footballer who plays as a forward for Tranmere Rovers, on loan from Dundee United. He has also previously played on loan for Arbroath, Inverness Caledonian Thistle and Ayr United.

Early life
Chalmers was born in Dundee on 24 March 2000 and joined the Dundee United Academy at the age of 10. He attended the Scottish Football Association Performance School at St John's Roman Catholic High School in Dundee.

Playing career

Club
Chalmers signed his first professional contract with Dundee United in July 2016. His first involvement with the first team was for Seán Dillon's testimonial match in March 2017. His competitive debut came in the Scottish League Cup in July 2017, when he came on as a substitute in a 4–1 home win over Cowdenbeath. He scored his first senior goal in October 2017, a late winner against Linfield in a Scottish Challenge Cup tie at Tannadice Park.

Chalmers was loaned to Arbroath in January 2020.

On 21 January 2022, Chalmers joined Scottish Championship side Inverness Caledonian Thistle on loan for the remainder of the 2021–22 season.

He was then loaned to Ayr United in September 2022. After a successful loan spell, Chalmers was recalled on 14 January 2023 amid speculation of a move to England. Two days later, he moved on loan to Tranmere Rovers.

International
Chalmers represented Scotland at under-17 level once, playing against the Czech Republic in August 2016. He was then capped by the under-21 team in October 2020.

Career statistics

References

External links

Living people
2000 births
Footballers from Dundee
Association football forwards
Scottish footballers
Dundee United F.C. players
Scottish Professional Football League players
Scotland youth international footballers
Arbroath F.C. players
Inverness Caledonian Thistle F.C. players
Scotland under-21 international footballers
Ayr United F.C. players
Tranmere Rovers F.C. players